Symphyotrichum boreale (formerly Aster borealis) is a species of flowering plant of the aster family (Asteraceae) native to North America.

Description
The leaves, stem, and overall plant form are slender, and it produces long rhizomes. The inflorescence consists of one to several composite flowers. The ray florets are white to pale purple, and the disc florets are cream or pale yellow, becoming purplish. The leaves are simple, with alternate or basal arrangement.

Taxonomy

Symphyotrichum boreale was formerly included in the large genus Aster as Aster borealis. However, this broad circumscription of Aster is polyphyletic and the North American asters are now mostly classified in Symphyotrichum and several other genera.

Hybrids between this species and Symphyotrichum puniceum have been recorded and are called Symphyotrichum × longulum.

Distribution and habitat
Symphyotrichum boreale is native to northern North America from Alaska to Newfoundland, and south to Colorado and West Virginia. It is found in wet, calcareous habitats including fens, marshes, swamps and wet meadows.

Ecology
In addition to vegetative spread via rhizomes, dispersal is accomplished by wind-blown seed. The roots are colonised by fungi including arbuscular mycorrhiza and dark septate endophytes. The sac fungus Erysiphe cichoracearum, which causes a powdery mildew, is also known from this species.

Citations

References

boreale
Flora of Canada
Flora of the United States
Plants described in 1841
Taxa named by John Torrey
Taxa named by Asa Gray